CBS Austin may refer to:

KEYE-TV in Austin, Texas
KIMT in Austin, Minnesota